Zeresh (Hebrew: זֶרֶשׁ) was the wife of Haman the Agagite who is mentioned in the Hebrew Bible in the Book of Esther. 

Zeresh advised her husband to prepare a high gallows (50 cubits) and to hang Mordecai on it (Esther 5:14). However, she later advised Haman that he would not be able to win against Mordecai (Esther 6:12-13). Their plans were soon reversed when King Ahasuerus ordered Haman to be hanged on the same gallows which he had prepared for Mordecai (Esther 7:9-10).  

Ten sons of Haman (and possibly of Zeresh) were later killed in fighting, and Ahasuerus had their bodies hanged on the same gallows that their father was hanged on(Esther 9:7-14). Zeresh's fate is not recorded.   

Book of Esther
Women in the Hebrew Bible